Daedalus (1791 – after 1794) was a British Thoroughbred racehorse and sire. In a brief career that lasted from April to October 1794 he ran three times and won once. He won the Derby on his racecourse debut, beating the smallest field in the history of the race. He was beaten in two races later that year and was retired.

Background
Daedalus (or Dædalus) was a bay horse bred by his owner Lord Grosvenor from his mare Flyer, who had previously produced the 1790 Derby winner Rhadamanthus. Daedalus and Rhadamanthus were the most notable horses sired by Lord Grosvenor's horse Justice, who during his racing career had won two races at Newmarket.

Racing career

1794: three-year-old season
Daedalus made his first racecourse appearance in the Derby at Epsom on 5 June. Forty-nine horses had been entered for the race at 50 guineas each, but only four ran, including a stable companion of Daedalus who was not included in the betting. This four-horse field was the smallest in Derby history. The Duke of Bedford's Leon was the 4/5 favourite, with Lord Egremont's unnamed Highflyer colt (later named Ragged Jack) the 2/1 second choice and Daedalus starting at odds of 6/1. Ridden by Frank Buckle, Daedalus won from the Highflyer colt, with Leon third. Daedalus gave his owner a third Derby win in five years, while Buckle was recording the second of his five victories.

After a break of four months, Daedalus returned to the racecourse for two runs at Newmarket in autumn. On 17 October he was one of three runners in a 100 guinea Sweepstakes over the two mile "Ditch In" course. Daedalus started favourite at odds of 4/6, but finished second at level weight to Mr Wilson's colt Bennington. Ten days later, Daedalus ran in another Sweepstakes over the same course and distance. On this occasion he started 5/2 second favourite and finished fourth of the six runners behind Bennington. At the end of the year Daedalus was sold to Mr. A Bayton and did not race again.

Retirement
Little is recorded of Daedalus after his sale to Mr. Bayton. He does not appear in any lists of stallions and has no progeny recorded in the General Stud Book which noted that he had been "sent to Russia." In Russia, he was owned by Count Alexis Orlov, the brother of Gregory Orlov, who also imported the 1792 St. Leger winner Tartar. Count Orlov mainly bred trotting horses, the "Orlov Trotters," that became a celebrated breed of harness racehorse in the 19th century with lines that have persisted to modern times.

Pedigree

References

1791 racehorse births
Epsom Derby winners
Racehorses bred in the Kingdom of Great Britain
Racehorses trained in the Kingdom of Great Britain
Thoroughbred family 1-a
Byerley Turk sire line